The Silver Slugger Award is awarded annually to the best offensive player at each position in both the American League (AL) and the National League (NL), as determined by the coaches and managers of Major League Baseball (MLB). These voters consider several offensive categories in selecting the winners, including batting average, slugging percentage, and on-base percentage, in addition to "coaches' and managers' general impressions of a player's overall offensive value". Managers and coaches are not permitted to vote for players on their own team. The Silver Slugger was first awarded in 1980 and is given by Hillerich & Bradsby, the manufacturer of Louisville Slugger bats. The award is a bat-shaped trophy, 3 feet (91 cm) tall, engraved with the names of each of the winners from the league and plated with sterling silver.

Among second basemen, Ryne Sandberg, who played 15 seasons with the Chicago Cubs in his 16-year career, owns the most Silver Sluggers with seven wins, including five consecutive from 1988 to 1992. Three other National League players have won the award four times. Jeff Kent (2000–2002, 2005) won three consecutive awards with the San Francisco Giants, before adding a fourth with the Los Angeles Dodgers; Craig Biggio, who played his entire career with the Houston Astros, won the award four times as a second baseman (1994–1995, 1997–1998) after winning another as a catcher. Chase Utley followed Kent's last win by capturing four consecutive awards (2006–2009).

In the American League, José Altuve has won six Silver Slugger awards. Altuve won five consecutive awards (2014–2018), all with the Astros, and won a sixth in 2022. Altuve's six Silver Slugger awards are second-most all-time for a second baseman and first among American League winners, ahead of Robinson Canó who is a five-time winner. Roberto Alomar won the award at the same position with three different teams (Baltimore Orioles, Toronto Blue Jays, Cleveland Indians). Julio Franco won four consecutive awards (1988–1991) with two different teams, and Lou Whitaker won four awards in five years (1983–1985, 1987) with the Detroit Tigers.

DJ LeMahieu holds the record for the highest batting average and slugging percentage in a second baseman's Silver Slugger-winning season with the respective .364 and .590 marks he set in the pandemic-shortened 2020 season. In the National League, Daniel Murphy's .347 batting average in 2016 ranks first. Willie Randolph, who won the inaugural award in the 1980 season, set a record for on-base percentage (.427) that has not yet been broken. Chuck Knoblauch is second behind Randolph in the American League with a .424 on-base percentage, a mark that was tied by Jeff Kent in 2000 to set the National League record. That year, Kent also set the record among second basemen for highest slugging percentage (.596) and the National League record for runs batted in (125). Bret Boone is the overall leader in runs batted in (141); this record was established in 2001. Marcus Semien hit 45 home runs in 2021, the most ever by a second baseman in a winning season, while Sandberg set the National League mark with 40 in 1990.

Key

American League winners

National League winners

See also

List of Gold Glove Award winners at second base

Notes

References

Inline citations

External links
Louisville Slugger – The Silver Slugger Award

Silver Slugger Award
Awards established in 1980